Ivory and Bone is a prehistoric fiction novel by Julie Eshbaugh, published by HarperTeen in June 2016. It is geared towards young adults, and is an Ice Age "allusion to Pride and Prejudice".

References

Novels set in prehistory
2016 American novels
HarperCollins books